Stanisław Badeni can refer to:
 Stanisław Badeni, royal secretary, ?-1824
 Stanisław Marcin Badeni, politician, 1850 - 1912